The All-China Federation of Industry and Commerce (ACFIC), also called the All-China Chamber of Industry and Commerce (ACCIC) is a non-governmental chamber of commerce, established in 1953 as a successor to the chambers of commerce that were first founded during the Qing dynasty. Today, it consists of Chinese industrialists and business people under the leadership of the United Front Work Department of the Chinese Communist Party (CCP), as well as being a constituent organization of the National Committee of the Chinese People's Political Consultative Conference and the holder of a number of seats in the National People's Congress. The organization assists the government in managing China's private sector economy and acts as a bridge between the private sector entities and the government.

Structure 
The agency is structured into the following departments:
 General Office
 Department of Research
 Department of Membership
 Department of Publicity and Education
 Department of Economic Service
 Department of Poverty Relief and Social Service
 Department of International Liaison
 Department of Legal Affairs
 Department of Human Resources

Leadership 
From November 2002 to 2012, the ACFIC had been led by Chairman Huang Mengfu, who, like his predecessors, was also a vice chairman of the Chinese People's Political Consultative Conference National Committee, ranking as a national leader of China. His predecessor was Jing Shuping, founder of the first private bank in modern China and the son of a well-known entrepreneur of the late Qing Dynasty.

The first vice-chairman of the ACFIC is Quan Zhezhu (Jeon Cheol-su)(), a deputy minister of the United Front Department originally from Jilin. The ACFIC has another 23 vice-chairpersons, most of them private entrepreneurs.

Regional federations
More than 3,000 regional federations of industry and commerce (FIC) have been established in all provinces and prefectures and most counties of China. As of 2009, they listed a combined membership of 2.6 million private enterprises. The relationship between ACFIC and the regional FIC is described as a role of guidance, but the statute of ACFIC is also valid for the regional federations.

In September 2020, the CCP announced that it would establish more party committees in regional FICs, and would arrange a special liaison between them and the CCP.

See also 

 Technological and industrial history of China

References

External links 

  

Organizations associated with the Chinese Communist Party
Trade in China
Chambers of commerce
Industry in China
Politics of China
Organizations established in 1953
1953 establishments in China
United front (China)
One institution with multiple names